The Alvord House is a historic stone farmhouse in the town of Salina, New York, just north of Syracuse.  The Alvord family were merchants in the then-emerging salt manufacturing business in the Salina area in the early 19th century. In 1835, this house was constructed on what was then a large tract of farmland. It was the main house amongst a small cluster of other homes and outbuildings on the family farm. Presently, the stone house is all that remains of the Alvord estate. It is contained within a small public park in the hamlet of Lyncourt. The house was added to the National Register of Historic Places in 1976.

See also
List of Registered Historic Places in Onondaga County, New York

References

Houses on the National Register of Historic Places in New York (state)
Houses in Onondaga County, New York
National Register of Historic Places in Onondaga County, New York
Houses completed in 1835
1835 establishments in New York (state)